Babis Mta (also known as Donguzorun) is a glacier-covered peak in the central part of the Greater Caucasus Mountain Range. The mountain is located on the border of Georgia and Kabardino-Balkaria, Russia. The Tsalgmili Range branches off from the southern flank of the mountain. The glaciers of Ledeshdvi, Dolra and Donguzorun descend from the slopes of Babis Mta.

History 
Donguzorun, or more precisely its eastern peak, was first climbed on August 7, 1888 by the British mountaineer W.F. Donkin and his companions.

References

Babis Mta
Mountains of Kabardino-Balkaria